S.C.OUT (an abbreviation for Star Clean Out) is a computer game developed and published by Atreid Concept in 1992 for Macintosh and MS-DOS.

Plot
S.C.OUT is an arcade/strategy game, where the goal is to reactivate a moonbase infested with aliens. The player is equipped with a variety of offensive weaponry to fight enemies, from entity to worm to slime. The player faces barriers to success, including doors (some locked), electronic doors, L.E.D. doors, barriers that will not allow cargo to cross them, and armored obstacles that can be destroyed only with continuous fire. The player can find devices to assist in this endeavor, from electric railways to portable batteries that give power to the railway. The player can also find safe zones and teleporters, as well as force mirrors that can be diagonal and four-way in nature.

Reception
The game was reviewed in 1993 in Dragon #196 by Hartley, Patricia, and Kirk Lesser in "The Role of Computers" column. The reviewers gave the game 3 out of 5 stars.

References

External links
S.C.OUT at MobyGames

1992 video games
Classic Mac OS games
DOS games
Strategy video games
Video games developed in France
Video games scored by Frédéric Motte